Aepytus is a genus of moths belonging to the family Hepialidae.

The species of this genus are found in Southern America.

Species:

Aepytus assa 
Aepytus biedermanni 
Aepytus brasiliensis 
Aepytus coscinophora 
Aepytus danieli 
Aepytus dorita 
Aepytus equatorialis 
Aepytus exclamans 
Aepytus fasslii 
Aepytus forsteri 
Aepytus guarani
Aepytus gugelmanni 
Aepytus guyanensis 
Aepytus helga 
Aepytus jeanneli 
Aepytus lagopus 
Aepytus mahagoniatus 
Aepytus mexicanensis 
Aepytus monoargenteus 
Aepytus munona 
Aepytus omagua 
Aepytus petropolisiensis 
Aepytus philiponi 
Aepytus pluriargenteus 
Aepytus saguanmachica 
Aepytus serta 
Aepytus sladeni 
Aepytus tesseloides 
Aepytus thisbe 
Aepytus verresi 
Aepytus yungas 
Aepytus zischkai

References

Hepialidae